Anant Bhargava (1923 – 2 December 2005) was an Indian wrestler. He competed in the men's freestyle welterweight at the 1948 Summer Olympics.

References

External links
 

1923 births
2005 deaths
Indian male sport wrestlers
Olympic wrestlers of India
Wrestlers at the 1948 Summer Olympics
Place of birth missing
20th-century Indian people